The Pentax LX is a 35 mm single-lens reflex camera produced by Pentax in Japan. It was introduced in 1980 and produced until 2001.  The LX uses the K mount which is the Pentax proprietary bayonet lens mount.  It has manual and aperture priority automatic exposure modes. It is the top-of-the-line "professional" or "system" camera in the Pentax manual focus range, and has a large range of accessories.  Compared with contemporary professional camera bodies from rival manufacturers, like the Canon New F-1 or Nikon F3, the LX body is smaller and lighter, weighing in at 570 grams (20 ounces) with standard FA-1 finder.

Due to the peculiar font used for the Pentax LX logo, the model is sometimes misspelled as ILX.

Construction and features 
Construction is strong and durable, with a solid cast metal frame and metal covering plates. All buttons and dials are weather and dust sealed, a unique feature not found on other professional cameras of the day. Underneath the satin black finish is black chrome, so that even as the surface finish inevitably wore through in hard professional use, the underlying metal would not look brassy. Both the viewfinder and the focusing screen are interchangeable to suit the task at hand, a large choice of alternatives were available. 
 
The camera has an uncommon frame counter, being able to keep track of the frame number in either direction, whether advancing or rewinding the film; this feature dramatically adds to the flexibility of the camera, as well as aids in multiple exposures. The camera has a multi-function lever that supports mirror lock-up, self-timer and depth of field preview. Both a winder and motor drive were available, and a full complement of other professional accessories.  The film take-up spool is of the "Magic-Needles" type, as found on Pentax M Series cameras, which simplified loading. Two databacks are available, one of which superimposes up to three characters chosen by the user in a corner of the frame, and the other superimposes a tiny analog clockface.  Also taking advantage of the removable back is a high capacity magazine allowing for 250 exposures.

Shutter and metering 
The shutter and metering systems are very sophisticated, as much or more than any other camera of its time. The titanium shutter curtains are horizontally running with a flash synchronization ('X') speed of 1/75 second. The film speed dial can be set from 6 to 3200 ASA, and co-axially is an exposure compensation dial. When in compensation mode is active, a small flag appears in the viewfinder to remind of the change from normal. The LX uses dynamic, off-the-film-plane TTL metering called Integrated Direct Metering (IDM).

Pre-release exposure information is obtained from light passing through a semi-silvered area of the mirror and then reflected down by a small secondary mirror to a metering cell in the base of the camera. From this, the user is given a shutter speed prediction by means of a vertical row of LEDs in the viewfinder. In auto mode, once the shutter is released, the light reflected from the first shutter curtain and the film continues to be measured by the same photocell as the exposure takes place, and is used to adjust the exposure time even if the subject light level is varying. This exposure metering has a range from EV1 to EV19 for manual exposure and an EV-6.5 to EV20 in automatic making the camera excellent for available light photography, in which automatic exposures can be up to 125 seconds.
 
In manual mode the predicted shutter speed is still displayed in the viewfinder but becomes a recommendation, and the user can choose any other speed indicated by aligning the translucent blue flag along the LED row. The shutter is controlled in manual mode mechanically at flash sync speed and all speeds above it, and electronically for all speeds below it.  The whole upper range of speeds, including the flash sync speed, is thus available without batteries in the camera.
 
Because the metering is entirely within the body of the camera, it functions fully with any of the interchangeable viewfinders, or even without one for that matter. The system also removes any necessity for a viewfinder window blind. The lens aperture is visible in the viewfinder via a Judas window with the principle ones of the seven alternative viewfinders.

TTL flash control is also available using Pentax and certain third party dedicated units in the hot shoe (e.g. the Pentax AF280T), which are controlled by the camera taking measurements from the IDM during the exposure.  The TTL capabilities are extended to dedicated external flash units (such as the Pentax AF400T hammerhead unit) via a special lead which connects to the conventional PC socket and additional contacts adjacent to it.  The hot shoe and PC socket can also be used with non-dedicated flash units.

Variations and special releases 
In October 1981, Pentax made available 300 limited edition Pentax LX Gold cameras to celebrate having produced 10 million SLR cameras, the first camera manufacturer to reach that milestone according to the accompanying certificate. The camera and its SMC 1:1.2 50 mm lens is partly gold plated and partly covered in brown reptile skin, while some details are made of brown plastic, and it came with a brown ever-ready case. Cameras for some markets such as the U.S. have brown leather instead of reptile skin supposedly due to import laws. The actual number of cameras made is somewhat higher than 300 since a few were retained at Pentax reserved for their own use. The actual number for sale however was 300 cameras according to Pentax in Tokyo. It is a superb example of Japanese camera workmanship.

Three limited editions of the Pentax LX were subsequently distributed on the Japanese market according to the Asahi Optical Historical Club:
 The Pentax LX Titanium was produced in 1994 to mark the company's 75th anniversary. The titanium plated limited edition of apparently only 1000 LX cameras for the Japanese market came in a presentation box. 
 Another Pentax LX Titanium was launched in 1996, finished in black in a limited number of 300.
 The Pentax LX 2000 with a SMC Pentax-A 50mm ƒ/1.2 lens in bright metal finish marked the new millennium in the year 2000.

References

External links

 Bojidar Dimitrov's Pentax K-Mount Equipment Page: LX (early version), LX (late version)
 Pentax LX Factory service
 The Asahi Optical Historical Club
 Leo Foo's Pentax LX site

LX
135 film cameras
Pentax K-mount cameras